The Mechthild Esser Nemmers Prize in Medical Science, established in 2016, is awarded every other year by Northwestern University Feinberg School of Medicine. The recipient is "a physician-scientist whose body of research exhibits outstanding achievement in their discipline as demonstrated by works of lasting significance". The winner is determined by a jury of biomedical scientists and receives $200,000. The award is one of five Nemmers Prizes awarded by the University, created as a gift to Northwestern by the late brothers Erwin Esser Nemmers and Frederic Esser Nemmers.

Nominations for the 2022 award are being accepted through November 1, 2021.

Awardees
The following recipients have received this award:

2016: Huda Zoghbi, MD
2018: Stuart Orkin, MD
2020: Not awarded
2022: Jeremy Nathans, MD, PhD

See also
 List of medicine awards

References

Northwestern University's web page describing the origin of the Prize and biographical notes on Nemmers
Northwestern University's web page describing the Nemmers Prize in Medical Science

Northwestern University